The Rhode Island Lady Stingrays were a W-League club based in Providence, Rhode Island, USA, associated with the Men's USL team, the Rhode Island Stingrays. The team folded after the 2004 season.

Year-by-year

References

Soccer clubs in Rhode Island
Defunct USL W-League (1995–2015) teams
2004 disestablishments in Rhode Island
Association football clubs disestablished in 2004
2004 establishments in Rhode Island
Association football clubs established in 2004
Women's sports in Rhode Island